Paolo Lorenzi was the defender of title, but he lost to Kavčič in the first round.
Blaž Kavčič won in the final 7–5, 6–3, against Jesse Levine.

Seeds

Draw

Final four

Top half

Bottom half

References
 Main Draw
 Qualifying Draw

Alessandria Challenger - Singles
Alessandria Challenger